Stephen Francis Von Till Jr. is an American musician, poet, and educator, best known as the guitarist of the band Neurosis, in which he also shared lead vocals with former member Scott Kelly. Following Kelly's departure in 2019, he is now the sole lead vocalist for the band. He also records solo work under both his given name and the moniker Harvestman.

Career

Von Till joined Neurosis in 1989. and the group would later form experimental/noise group Tribes of Neurot, Neurosis' alter ego.

Solo 
Von Till's solo music as a singer songwriter has been described as a hybrid of "haunting" folk songs, rural psychedelia and expansive gothic Americana full of melancholic beauty. These songs are often built around sparse arrangements, the centerpiece of which is his distinctive solemn weathered voice and minimal acoustic guitar stylings.

In many ways a catch all for his other musical interests and influences, distilling his love for home recorded psychedelia, ambient, folk, lo-fi, krautrock, fuzz guitars, analog delays, and vintage synthesizers into a cohesive meditative body of work.  Borrowing the concept from dub music of using the recording studio as an instrument, Von Till often considers the mixes themselves as the performance where he is able to break down, manipulate, and rebuild the tracks into new forms.

On May 6, 2020, Von Till announced a collection of poetry and lyrics titled Harvestman.

Equipment

Von Till plays Jazzcaster- and Telecaster-style guitars assembled from Warmoth parts. He employs Lollar P90 (bridge) and Bartolini strat style (neck) pickups. His main distortion pedals are Keeley modded ProCo Rat pedals, a vintage MXR Distortion +, Land of the Rising Fuzz shin ei clone, and a Fulltone OCD.

Using a wide variety of delay and modulation effects, his pedalboards have been known to include the Mutron Phasor II, MXR Carbon Copy delay, Dry Bell Vibe Machine uni-vibe clone, Electro-Harmonix Bass Micro Synthesizer, and a Chicago Iron Parachute Wah. His signal routing is all controlled by a custom made switching system by Bob Bradshaw of Custom Audio Electronics. The signal is routed to a Mesa/Boogie Mark IV with 2 2x12 Ear Candy cabs and a Garnet Session Man 2x12 combo (commonly replaced with a Fender ’65 Twin Reverb Reissue combo when renting gear).

Von Till's main acoustic guitar is a 1965 Gibson J-50 when playing solo as Harvestman.

Personal life
Outside his role as a musician, Von Till works as an elementary school teacher in North Idaho.

Discography

With Neurosis 
The Word as Law (1990)
Empty (EP, 1990)
Souls at Zero (1992)
Enemy of the Sun (1993)
Through Silver in Blood (1996)
Times of Grace (1999)
Sovereign (EP, 2000)
A Sun That Never Sets (2001)
Neurosis & Jarboe (2003)
The Eye of Every Storm (2004)
Given to the Rising (2007)
Honor Found in Decay (2012)
Fires Within Fires (2016)

With Tribes of Neurot 
Rebegin (1995)
Silver Blood Transmission (1995)
Static Migration (1998)
Grace (1999)
60° (2000)
Adaptation and Survival: the Insect Project (2002)
Meridian (2005)

Solo albums 
As the Crow Flies (2000)
If I Should Fall to the Field (2002)
A Grave Is a Grim Horse (2008)
A Life Unto Itself (2015)
 No Wilderness Deep Enough (2020)

As Harvestman 
Lashing the Rye (2005)
In a Dark Tongue (2009)
Trinity Score to the film h2odio, a full-length feature film by Italian director Alex Infascelli.
Music for Megaliths (2017)

References

External links
Steve Von Till's official website

Living people
American male guitarists
American heavy metal singers
American heavy metal guitarists
American male singers
Gothic country musicians
Neurosis (band) members
Year of birth missing (living people)